Kimley-Horn and Associates, Inc. is an American planning, surveying, engineering, and design consulting firm. The company was ranked #22 on Fortune's "100 Best Companies to Work For" list in 2022, its 15th year on the list. Engineering News-Record ranked Kimley-Horn as #10 in its "Top 500 Design Firms" list in 2022, climbing five spots from the 2021 survey.

Overview
Kimley-Horn was founded in Raleigh, North Carolina in 1967 by three transportation engineers: Bob Kimley, Bill Horn, and Ed Vick. Kimley-Horn has approximately 5,476 employees as of 2022.

Awards

 #62 in Fortune Best Workplaces for Women™ 2022 (Large)
 #5 in Fortune Best Workplaces in Consulting & Professional Services™ 2022 (Large)
 #59 in PEOPLE® Companies that Care, 2022
 #31 in Best Workplaces for Millennials™ 2022 (Large)
 #22 in Fortune 100 Best Companies to Work For® 2022

References

External links
 

Construction and civil engineering companies of the United States
Construction and civil engineering companies established in 1967
Engineering consulting firms of the United States
American companies established in 1967
Design companies established in 1967
1967 establishments in North Carolina